The county of Suffolk was divided into hundreds between Saxon times and the 19th century when, although never formally abolished, they were effectively replaced for administrative purposes by districts.

In 1831 the county was subdivided into twenty-one hundreds and three municipal boroughs. The majority of these hundreds had remained unchanged since the time of the Domesday Survey, except that in 1086 Babergh was listed as two hundreds, Cosford, Ipswich and Parham as half hundreds and Samford as a hundred and a half. Hoxne hundred was then known as Bishops hundred and the vills which were included later in Thredling hundred were within Claydon hundred.

List of hundreds (1831)

In addition the county contained three boroughs, corresponding to the county's largest towns:

See also
History of Suffolk
List of hundreds of England and Wales

References

 
Suffolk